is a 2012 Japanese drama film directed by Seiki Nagahara.

Cast
 Kenta Kamakari
 Chisun
 Masaya Nakamura

References

External links
  
 

2012 films
Japanese drama films
2012 drama films
2010s Japanese films